Lukulu Airport  is an airport serving Lukulu, a city in the Western Province of Zambia.

The airport is within the city. West approach and departure cross the Zambezi River.

See also

Transport in Zambia
List of airports in Zambia

References

External links
FallingRain - Lukulu Airport
OpenStreetMap - Lukulu
SkyVector - Lukulu Airport

 Google Earth

Airports in Zambia
Buildings and structures in Western Province, Zambia